

Hermann von Wedel (27 July 1893 – 5 February 1944) was a German general (Generalmajor) in the Wehrmacht during World War II. He was a recipient of the Knight's Cross of the Iron Cross of Nazi Germany. Wedel was wounded during the Battle of Narva and died in hospital in Dorpat, Estonia on 5 February 1944.

Awards

 Knight's Cross of the Iron Cross on 8 June 1943 as Oberst and commander of Grenadier-Regiment 590

References

Citations

Bibliography

 
 

1893 births
1944 deaths
Military personnel from Magdeburg
Major generals of the German Army (Wehrmacht)
German Army personnel of World War I
German Army personnel killed in World War II
Recipients of the clasp to the Iron Cross, 1st class
Recipients of the Gold German Cross
Recipients of the Knight's Cross of the Iron Cross
Prussian Army personnel
Wedel family
German Army generals of World War II